Austin Blythe (born June 16, 1992) is a former American football center who played seven seasons in the National Football League (NFL). He played college football at Iowa, and was drafted by the Indianapolis Colts in the seventh round of the 2016 NFL Draft. He has also played for the Los Angeles Rams,  Kansas City Chiefs, and the Seattle Seahawks.

College career
Blythe was a four-year starter at Iowa, appearing in 52 games. As a senior, he aided the Hawkeyes to a 12–0 start, earning a spot in the Big Ten Championship and the 2016 Rose Bowl. He was a finalist for the Rimington Award, which is given annually to the nation's top center, in his senior season.

Professional career

Indianapolis Colts
Blythe was drafted in the seventh round (248th overall) of the 2016 NFL draft by the Indianapolis Colts. He signed his rookie contract with the Colts on May 5, 2016. As a rookie in 2016, he served as a backup center behind fellow rookie Ryan Kelly. In the 2016 season, Blythe played in eight games with one start.

On May 15, 2017, Blythe was waived by the Colts.

Los Angeles Rams
On May 16, 2017, Blythe was claimed off waivers by the Los Angeles Rams. He played in all 16 games in 2017 and earned his first start of the season in Week 17 at left guard.

Blythe entered the 2018 season as the starting right guard after incumbent starter Jamon Brown was suspended the first two games of the year. Upon Brown's return, Blythe maintained his starting role.

On March 26, 2020, Blythe re-signed with the Rams.

Kansas City Chiefs
Blythe signed with the Kansas City Chiefs on April 5, 2021.

Seattle Seahawks
Blythe signed with the Seattle Seahawks on March 21, 2022.

Blythe played and started 17 games in his one season with the Seahawks. He also started in the wild card round for the Seahawks.

On February 28, 2023, Blythe announced his retirement from the NFL after seven seasons.

Personal life
Blythe is a graduate of Williamsburg (Iowa) High School, where he was a two-time all-state football player at center and a three-time state champion in wrestling. He married Kiley Ritchie, daughter of his high school football coach, in 2015. The two had known each other since elementary school, but did not begin dating until college. In June 2016, he and his wife had a son. In January 2020, he and his wife had their second child, a daughter. In October of 2022, the couple welcomed their third child, a daughter, into the world.

References

External links
 Seattle Seahawks bio
  Iowa Hawkeyes bio

1992 births
Living people
People from Williamsburg, Iowa
Players of American football from Iowa
American football centers
Iowa Hawkeyes football players
Indianapolis Colts players
Los Angeles Rams players
Kansas City Chiefs players
Seattle Seahawks players